Project X may refer to:

Entertainment 
 Project X, a novel by Jim Shepard
 A fictional weapon in the novel Atlas Shrugged
 Project X Entertainment, a production/financing company run by James Vanderbilt, William Sherak, and Paul Neinstein

Film and TV 
 Project X (1949 film), an American film
 Project X (1968 film), a science fiction film featuring Christopher George
 Project X (1987 film), a film starring Matthew Broderick
 Project X (2012 film), a comedy film about three teens who have a party that gets out of control
 Project X: Chôsensha tachi (2000–2005), a documentary television series hosted by NHK presenter Junko Kubo

Gaming 
 Project X, a racing car game for Tizen
 Project-X, a 1992 scrolling shooter game for the Amiga computer
 Project X (series), a series of crossover tactical role-playing games for the PlayStation 2 and later Nintendo 3DS

Music 
 Project X (band), a 1987 short-lived band
 Project X: Iconic, a 2009 hip hop album by Tim Dog with Kool Keith and Mark Live
 Project X (album), 2021 album by Ken Carson

Technology 
 Project X (accelerator), a proposed high intensity proton accelerator at the Fermi National Accelerator Laboratory
 SIGSALY, an early secure speech system also known as "Project X"
 Code name of HotSauce, experimental visualization software developed by Apple Computer
 Original name of Nuon (DVD technology), a platform to enhance DVDs

Other 
 Project X, a warez group, scene release group that released Xbox games
 Project X Haren, an out of control birthday party which resulted in street riots in Haren, Netherlands, named after the 2012 Project X movie
 A military effort of the Army Foreign Intelligence Assistance Program
 A scandal involving Department of Homeland Security employee Laura Callahan
 An early code name for the Walt Disney World Resort
 Code name for the development of the Messerschmitt Me 163 World War II aircraft

See also 
 Weapon X (disambiguation)